Superior Junction is a community in the town of Sioux Lookout, Kenora District in northwestern Ontario, Canada. It is on the Marchington River downstream of Botsford Lake and upstream of the river's mouth at Abram Lake on the English River.

Transportation
Superior Junction lies on the Canadian National Railway transcontinental main line, between the centre of the town of Sioux Lookout to the west and Rosnel to the east, has a passing track, and is passed but not served by Via Rail transcontinental Canadian trains. It is also at the junction of a CN branch line that heads to and comes from Thunder Bay at the southeast; the next point on the line is Alcona.

Ontario Highway 642 crosses the Marchington River and CN main line at Superior Junction.

References

Communities in Kenora District